NextEra Energy, Inc. is an American energy company with about 58 GW of generating capacity (24 GW of which were from fossil fuel sources), revenues of over $18 billion in 2020, and about 14,900 employees throughout the US and Canada. It is the largest electric utility holding company by market capitalization. Its subsidiaries include Florida Power & Light (FPL), NextEra Energy Resources (NEER), NextEra Energy Partners, Gulf Power Company, and NextEra Energy Services.

FPL, the largest of the subsidiaries, delivers rate-regulated electricity to approximately 5 million customer accounts, or an estimated 10 million people, across nearly half of Florida and is the third largest electric utility company in the United States. NEER, together with its affiliated entities, is the world's largest generator of renewable energy from the wind and sun. In addition to wind and solar, NextEra Energy Resources owns and operates generating plants powered by natural gas, nuclear energy, and oil. As of 2020, approximately 41% of NextEra Energy's generating capacity was from fossil fuels and non-renewables.
The company ranked 167th on the 2018 Fortune 500 of the largest United States corporations by revenue.

Corporate history 

The predecessor company Florida Power & Light Company was founded in 1925. It reorganized as the company FPL Group Inc. in 1984, as part of efforts to diversify its business. FPL Group changed its name to NextEra Energy Inc. in March 2010. At this time, the stock ticker symbol also changed from FPL to NEE.

Nextera Energy is incorporated in Florida.

Politics 
During the 2016 Republican Party presidential primaries, NextEra Energy donated $1 million to a Super PAC supporting Jeb Bush's presidential candidacy.

Mergers and acquisitions 
In January 1998, FPL Group announced that it would purchase 35 generating plants from Central Maine Power Company for $846 million. It later went to court in an attempt to cancel the transaction, citing an adverse regulatory ruling on access to the electric transmission network. After that effort failed, FPL completed the purchase in 1999.

In March 2000, FPL Group and Spanish company Iberdrola SA were reported to be in "extensive merger discussions". The  talks were terminated and the merger transaction was not consummated due to opposition from Iberdrola's board, according to news reports.

In July 2000, FPL Group and Entergy Corporation announced plans to merge. The companies terminated the merger in April 2001.

In June 2005, FPL Energy, a subsidiary of FPL Group, acquired Houston-based Gexa Energy in June 2005 for $80.6 million.

In December 2005, FPL Group announced an $11 billion all-stock acquisition of Maryland-based Constellation Energy Group. The companies mutually agreed to terminate the sale in October 2006 due to uncertainty over regulatory and judicial matters in Maryland.

On December 4, 2014, NextEra Energy announced its plans to purchase Hawaiian Electric Industries for $4.3 billion. However, in July 2016, Hawaii's Public Utilities Commission rejected the offer in a 2-0 vote over doubts of NextEra Energy's commitment to the state's renewable energy goal, which terminated the merger agreement. The proposed merger had support from over 25 local groups, including the Hawaii State AFL–CIO and the Hawaii Chamber of Commerce.

NextEra Energy and Energy Future Holdings, parent company of Texas-based utility Oncor Electric Delivery, reached a $18.7 billion merger agreement on July 29, 2016, but the agreement was terminated in July 2017 after the Texas Public Utility Commission rejected the offer over disagreement on the control of Oncor's board of directors. Two other competing bids were submitted in July 2017 for purchasing Oncor, including a $17.5 billion bid from Berkshire Hathaway Energy and a $18.5 billion bid from Elliott Management Corporation.

In January 2018, NextEra Energy expressed interest with members of the South Carolina Senate over a possible purchase of SCANA and Santee Cooper. Dominion Energy offered $14.6 billion to buy SCANA, but South Carolina lawmakers harshly criticized the proposal over a lack of future taxpayer relief. In February 2018, NextEra Energy floated a $15.9 billion proposal to buy Santee Cooper and briefed South Carolina lawmakers.

In May 2018, NextEra Energy announced that it planned to buy Gulf Power Company, the largest electricity producer in Northwest Florida, from Southern Company in a $6.4 billion deal, pending approval from regulators. The acquisition, which expanded NextEra Energy's combined residential customer base in Florida to approximately 51 percent of the state's population and also included Florida City 
Gas, was completed on January 1, 2019.

Corporate affairs

Board of Directors
As of August 16, 2020:
 Sherry Barrat, former Northern Trust executive
 James Camaren, former chairman and CEO of Utilities, Inc.
 Kenneth Dunn, former dean of the Tepper School of Business
 Naren Gursahaney, former president and CEO of ADT
 Kirk Hachigan, former chairman and CEO of Jeld-Wen
 Toni Jennings, former lieutenant governor of Florida
 Amy Lane, former Merrill Lynch executive
 David Porges, former chairman and CEO of EQT
 James Robo, chairman, president, and CEO of NextEra
 Rudy Schupp, former president and CBO of Valley National Bank
 John Skolds, former Exelon executive
 William H. Swanson, former chairman and CEO of Raytheon
 Darryl Wilson, former GE Power executive

Litigation
In 2016, New Hampshire Transmission, a subsidiary of NextEra Energy, was fined $6.8M for illegally charging millions of dollars worth of development costs to New England ratepayers.

In January 2018, NextEra Energy, along with Entergy, withdrew from the Nuclear Energy Institute (NEI) over disagreements on the trade group's agenda. In February 2018, NextEra Energy filed a lawsuit against NEI, accusing the trade group of "retaliatory action" and "extortion", claiming that NEI revoked its ability to access the Personnel Access Data System (PADS), the nuclear industry personnel database, unless $860,000 was paid. The president and CEO of NEI responded that the organization "vehemently denies all of the allegations in NextEra’s lawsuit and will vigorously defend our position in court" and that "NextEra lost the ability to participate in PADS upon choosing to discontinue its NEI membership".

In June 2018, the United States Court of Appeals for the Eleventh Circuit rejected NextEra Energy's claim for a $97 million tax deduction for $200 million paid in contract fees to the federal government toward the Nuclear Waste Fund. NextEra Energy sought to deduct payments made between 2003 and 2010 for "the disposal of radioactive waste produced by nuclear power plants operated by subsidiaries Florida Power & Light Co. and NextEra Energy Resources", but the court reasoned that the contract fees "do not qualify as specified liability losses".

In August 2018, NextEra Energy received a cease and desist order by Oklahoma state officials concerning the construction of wind turbines violating state law. The Oklahoma state law, which took effect in May 2018 to protect open air space, states that developers obtain either a "no hazard" determination for each turbine from the Federal Aviation Administration (FAA) or work out a mitigation plan with the United States Department of Defense (DoD), and then submit notification of such with the Oklahoma Corporation Commission before construction may begin. NextEra Energy had filed obstruction evaluation cases for the construction of wind turbines in Oklahoma with the FAA in March 2018, but the FAA had yet to issue determinations at the time that the cease and desist order was issued. In 2022, NextEra paid $8 million for missing eagle permits.

Finances 
For the fiscal year 2017, NextEra Energy reported earnings of US$5.378 billion, with an annual revenue of US$17.195 billion, an increase of 6.4% over the previous fiscal cycle. NextEra Energy's shares traded at over $261 per share, and its market capitalization was valued at over US$117 billion at the end of 2019.

Criticism

Avangrid transmission line project 
In 2021, NextEra was accused of lobbying heavily against a transmission line project proposed by Avangrid, Inc. The 145-mile line, to be known as New England Clean Energy Connect (NECEC), would have delivered hydroelectric power from Quebec to utilities in Massachusetts and Maine. In a complaint to federal regulators, the rival company said NextEra had “taken every opportunity, both in the open and behind the scenes, to oppose, delay, and derail” the project, including funding opposition groups because the hydropower would have provided competition to NextEra's oil-fired power plant in Yarmouth. “In doing so,” Avangrid wrote, “NextEra is purposely trying to thwart the goals of Maine and Massachusetts to obtain more renewable power.” According to Daily Energy Insider, Avangrid had obtained every regulatory approval required at the state and federal levels, and the project was supported by Maine Gov. Janet Mills, Massachusetts Gov. Charlie Baker, U.S. Energy Secretary Jennifer Granholm, and the stateʻs major newspapers. In November 2021, the voters of Maine approved a ballot initiative to prohibit construction of the $1 billion transmission line project, which had been represented as a choice between clean energy and the protection of pristine woodlands.

Solar power ballot initiatives 
NextEra Energy has backed failed ballot amendment campaigns to impose fees and barriers to installations of rooftop solar panels. In 2016, Florida Power & Light, which is a subsidiary of NextEra Energy, joined forces with Devon Energy, and Tampa Electric Company. As a group they spent $20 million promoting a failed ballot initiative in Florida that would have curbed rooftop solar installations. It drew criticism from Al Gore. “Over the last several years, NextEra has been very aggressive against customer-owned solar,” says Alissa Schafer, a researcher with the Energy and Policy Institute, a clean energy advocacy group.

In 2021, investigative reporting by the Miami Herald revealed that NextEra Energy had lobbied Florida legislators to undermine rooftop solar by preventing homeowners and businesses to engage in net metering (selling excess power back to FPL).  NextEra Energy, made a $10,000 donation to Women Building the Future, drafted a bill, had their lobbyist deliver the bill to Florida legislator Jennifer Bradley, and subsequently donated $10,000 to her re-election campaign. “This is a tired tactic that utilities have used to maintain their monopoly grip on electricity markets,” said Will Giese, southeast regional director for the Solar Energy Industries Association.

Opponents of the legislation claim that if such bills pass, the fast-growing green power industry would quickly start to collapse. "It's going to be a crusher for the solar industry," said Rutherford, founder of Tampa Bay Solar. According to him, he would have to lay off much of his workforce. "For 90% of the people that work for me, this will be a significant blow for their pocketbooks." Only the state of Nevada has tried such legislation before. In 2015, state regulators opted to cut the net-metering rate to a mere fraction of what it was. Travis Miller, owner of Great Solar Basin claims the solar industry went down overnight. California-based SolarCity did away with 550 jobs, holding the revised net-metering rate accountable. Other companies abandoned the state entirely. "Most of the local shops went out of business and closed their doors," Miller said. "There wasn't an industry at all." Two years of public outcries and lobbying by Tesla were needed for Nevada to reverse course. But the damage was done and further investment was slow to take off.

Florida legislature candidates 
In 2021, investigative reporting by the Orlando Sun Sentinel revealed that FPL funded political consultants more than $3 million to promote "ghost" spoiler candidates in key Florida legislature races. The spoiler candidates were on the ballot as a no-party option and were intended to confuse voters and dilute support for the Democratic candidate in each race. Former senator Frank Artiles and his accomplice were each charged with three third-degree felony charges related to violating campaign finance law, conspiracy to make campaign contributions in excess of legal limits, also making these excess contributions, and false swearing in connection to an election. The ploy was for the accomplice named "Rodriguez" to run as a sham candidate and siphon away votes from Democratic candidate: Senator Rodriguez. The mailing campaign employed the language of the Democratic candidate and had the accomplice focusing on fixing health care, and fighting climate change, all paid for by new, out-of-state political committees. The Democrats lost by a mere thirty two votes.

Court documents obtained by the Miami Herald, as part of the state attorney’s investigation, revealed that in the context of a ghost candidate scheme the organization "Let’s Preserve the American Dream" awarded $125,000 to former state Sen. Frank Artiles for “research”. His accomplice was promised $50K. Artiles has for years associated with Florida utilities, including NextEra and its subsidiary FPL. Artiles obtained over $30,000 in political contributions from Florida utilities throughout his time in office, which included $6,000 from NextEra, $4,500 from TECO, and $4,000 from Duke Energy, all direct contributions. Veterans for Conservative Principles, his political committee, accepted close to $13,000 from NextEra and $5,000 from Duke.

On April 21, 2017, Frank Artiles resigned from the Florida Senate after being caught using the N-word while in front of black co-workers. Not long after resigning, the Miami Herald nailed him for employing Hooters waitresses in the form of campaign "consultants." Prior to his resignation, Artiles fast-tracked pro-utility bills as former chairman of the Florida Senate’s Communications, Energy and Public Utilities Committee, including a bill that would have permitted NextEra to charge its fracking costs to Florida ratepayers.

In 2018, Senator Keith Perry won re-election against Democrat Kayser Enneking by around 2,000 votes, due to independent Charles Goston pulling votes away from Enneking. According to the Sentinel, FPL donated $14.15 million to a political ad nonprofit whose consultants were connected to one of the groups that paid for Goston's ads. FPL has also donated $20,000 to Perry’s political committee, Building a Prosperous Florida, while TECO has donated $2,500. The year before, Perry voted in support of NextEra’s exploratory fracking legislation while serving on the committee chaired by Artiles. Perry has accepted $13,500 in direct political donations from Florida utilities, including $1,000 from NextEra, $2,500 from NextEra company Gulf Power, $4,500 from Duke Energy, and $5,500 from TECO, according to campaign finance filings.

Environmental issues 
The National Park Service raised concerns that the coal plant would contaminate Lake Okeechobee with mercury and harm the Everglades.

On 5 January 2009, 30 environmental activists staged a five-day vigil along the Barley Barber Swamp to draw attention to what they claimed were damages being wrought by the power company's 3,705 megawatt Martin County plant. The activists claimed that the Martin County power plant's water use had caused the forest's health to decline. Much of the evidence behind such claims came from research conducted by Hydro-ecologist Dr. Sydney Bacchus. Dr. Bacchus claimed that the power plant's water use had caused "surficial aquifer drawdown". According to Dr Bacchus, the ecosystem perishes when the roots of the trees become exposed due to the lower water table.

In 2018, the 11th Circuit in Atlanta rejected NextEra's request for a $97M refund on costs related to the cleaning up of nuclear waste between 1969 and 1995.

In 2019, the Florida Supreme Court concluded that NextEra Energy could charge Florida ratepayers for over $132M in nuclear waste cleanup costs. The damage comes from its Turkey Point plant which funnels nuclear waste through a 5,900-acre series of cooling canals that stretch out across Biscayne Bay. But those canals date were constructed in 1972 and have since sprung some substantial leaks.

References

External links
 

 
Electric power companies of the United States
Companies based in Palm Beach County, Florida
Energy companies established in 1925
Non-renewable resource companies established in 1925
Companies listed on the New York Stock Exchange
Companies in the Dow Jones Utility Average
1925 establishments in Florida